The world record progression 3000 m speed skating women as recognised by the International Skating Union:

References

 Historical World Records. International Skating Union.
 

World 03000 women